The Milburn Baronetcy, of Guyzance in the Parish of Shilbottle in the County of Northumberland, is a title in the Baronetage of the United Kingdom. It was created on 30 December 1905 for John Milburn. He was high sheriff of Northumberland in 1905. The Milburn family had made their fortune in shipping and coal. The third Baronet served as High Sheriff of Northumberland in 1928.

Milburn baronets, of Guyzance (1905)
Sir John Davison Milburn, 1st Baronet (1851–1907)
Sir Charles Stamp Milburn, 2nd Baronet (1878–1917)
Sir Leonard John Milburn, 3rd Baronet (1884–1957)
Sir John Nigel Milburn, 4th Baronet (1918–1985)
Sir Anthony Rupert Milburn, 5th Baronet (born 1947)

Notes

References
Kidd, Charles, Williamson, David (editors). Debrett's Peerage and Baronetage (1990 edition). New York: St Martin's Press, 1990, 

Baronetcies in the Baronetage of the United Kingdom